In the Sign of Evil is the first EP and the debut release by German thrash metal band Sodom, released in 1985 by Devil's Game independent label. The record is considered part of the first wave of black metal. Despite the melodic rawness, the over-the-top lyrics ("My life begins at midnight twelve, masturbate to kill myself") and the elementary structure of the songs, two of them ("Outbreak of Evil" and "Blasphemer") were regularly played by the band thirty-five years into its career, and are considered crowd favorites.

The tracks from In the Sign of Evil were re-recorded in 2007 and released as The Final Sign of Evil.

Release
The EP is widely available as the bonus tracks in the CD version of their debut album Obsessed by Cruelty (1986). Tracks from this EP have appeared on all three live Sodom albums: Mortal Way of Live (1988), Marooned - Live (1994) and One Night in Bangkok (2003).

Track listing

Personnel

Sodom
 Tom Angelripper – vocals, bass
 Grave Violator (Josef "Peppi" Dominik) – guitar
 Witchhunter (Christian Dudek) – drums

Production
 Detleft Schmidt – sleeve design
 Horst Müller – engineering
 Sven Clasen – band management
 Joachim Pieczulski – album cover painting
 Wolfgang Eicholz – production

References

External links

1985 debut EPs
Sodom (band) EPs
Black metal EPs